Mya is a genus of saltwater clams, marine bivalve molluscs in the family Myidae. They are widespread and abundant in northern waters. Commonly known as Ipswich clams, soft-shell clam or steamers, they are routinely used as a food source for humans.

Species
Species within the genus Mya include:
Mya arenaria Linnaeus, 1758
Mya baxteri Coan & Scott, 1997
Mya eideri Hopner Petersen, 1999
Mya japonica Jay, 1857
Mya neoovata Hopner Petersen, 1999
Mya neouddevallensis Hopner Petersen, 1999
Mya pseudoarenaria Schlesch, 1931
Mya truncata Linnaeus, 1758

References

Myidae
Bivalve genera